Sophie Chang (born May 28, 1997) is an American tennis player.

Chang has career-high WTA rankings of No. 217 in singles, reached in January 2023, and No. 59 in doubles, achieved September 2022. She has won one WTA Tour doubles title with Angela Kulikov in July 2022. On the ITF Circuit, Chang has won 16 doubles titles, five of them with Alexandra Mueller, and three singles titles.

Career
She made her WTA Tour main-draw debut at the 2017 Washington Open, in the doubles draw, partnering with Alexandra Mueller. She has won one doubles title on the WTA Tour at the 2022 Hamburg European Open, partnering with Angela Kulikov. Her first Tour level singles match was at the 2022 Charleston Open.

Grand Slam performance timelines

Singles

WTA career finals

Doubles: 1 (title)

ITF Circuit finals

Singles: 5 (3 titles, 2 runner–ups)

Doubles: 30 (16 titles, 14 runner–ups)

Notes

References

External links
 
 

1997 births
Living people
American female tennis players
People from Havre de Grace, Maryland
21st-century American women
Tennis people from Maryland